Transformers: Shattered Glass is a series of American comic books and prose stories published by Fun Publications published between 2008 and 2011, being based on the Transformers franchise by Hasbro. Two reboot series are being published between 2021 and 2022 by IDW Publishing.

The main storyline is about a universe that is different from the official timeline, where the roles between Autobots and Decepticons as heroes and villains were switched.

Fun Publications series (2008–2011)

IDW Publishing series (2021–2022)

Development

Transformers: Shattered Glass (2021) 
On April 9, 2021, during Hasbro Pulse Fan Fest 2021, IDW Publishing announced a five-issue comic book series based on the Transformers: Shattered Glass brand, with new toys based on Blurr, Megatron, Starscream, Goldbug and Jetfire. The series is written by Danny Lore, and was set for release on August 25, 2021.

Lore said, "As a writer, I love exploring characterization, what the core elements are that make someone who and what they are. Creating these Shattered Glass versions of childhood favorites is like building the perfect Combiner for me: what are the nuts and bolts that we can swap out while still making them recognizable?"

IDW editor Riley Farmer also said, "Our wonderful partners at Hasbro made a huge splash with their recent announcement of new Megatron and Blurr action figures packaged with our Shattered Glass comics, and we’re proud to bring that story content -- and specifically three cover variants exclusively available to the comics retail channels -- to the wide audience of monthly comics readers".

The series concluded on December 22, 2021 after five issues.

Transformers: Shattered Glass II (2022) 
In May 2022, IDW and Hasbro announced a sequel series titled Transformers: Shattered Glass II, set to be published in August 2022. The series features the return of most of the creative team of the previous series, with the addition of artist Marcelo Matere.

The series is one of the last projects presented by IDW before the publisher passes the Transformers comic book license back to Hasbro at the end of 2022.

Lore said, "it was a world full of passionate revolutionaries, terrifying warlords, and lots of big things going boom. The chance to revisit Shattered Glass, giving you even more of all that, really feels like coming home—a very explosive home with a lot of really tall folk, but home nonetheless!”

Khanna agreed that "it’s great to return to the Shattered Glass universe where we continue to flesh out this whole new twisted mirror take on the normal Transformers universe. I think fans will really enjoy this latest chapter from this alternate reality."

Guidi said, "in the first miniseries, I really loved depicting Blurr as a bad guy and Jetfire’s struggle for Starscream, playing with their facial expressions and their body language, yet keeping their basic traits from their original counterparts. But I can say that I’m having fun with any of the characters at this point. It’s a really refreshing challenge to draw them as their opposite, yet make them convincing and natural in their new roles, for both new readers and older fans."

Matere also said, "after reading the script, one line helped to guide my art style for this book: a description of the Wreckers in a gangster or mobster scenario, calling for lots of shadows and black silhouettes of the characters, It’s been great experimentation moving my art to this new level."

IDW editor Riley Farmer said, “it’s so exciting to be bringing even more Shattered Glass characters to life. We always want to give the fans what they want, and when we can give them an awesome comic book series and provide backstory for amazing toys through our partnership with Hasbro…well, what could be better?”

The series concluded on December 14, 2022 after five issues.

Issues

Reception

Collected edition

Trade paperback

Other

References 

Comics based on Hasbro toys
2008 comics debuts
2011 comics endings
Shattered Glass
Shattered Glass